Christopher Blewitt (born May 2, 1995) is an American football placekicker who is a free agent. He played college football for the Pittsburgh Panthers, where he finished as their all-time leader in field goals made and second all-time in total points. Blewitt originally signed as an undrafted free agent with the Chicago Bears in 2019. He has also been a member of the Washington Football Team.

High school and college 
In his junior and senior year at West Potomac High School, Blewitt was ranked as one of the top kickers in his class. He was offered a scholarship by the University of Pittsburgh in June 2012 following a standout performance at the Panthers' specialist camp. In 2013, Blewitt took over the starting duties as Pitt's kicker. He broke many previously set records as a freshman. From 2014 to 2015, Blewitt continued breaking records and leading Pitt in scoring. In 2016, he finished his career at Pitt as their all-time kick scoring leader, with 363 points from 55 field goals and 198 extra points.

Professional career

Chicago Bears
Blewitt was invited to Pittsburgh Steelers rookie minicamp in May 2017 but was not offered a contract. He later signed with the Chicago Bears on March 6, 2019, but was waived on June 12, 2019.

Washington Football Team
Blewitt signed with the Washington Football Team's practice squad in October 2021. He was promoted to the active roster after their previous kicker, Dustin Hopkins, was released on October 20, but was waived on November 9 after getting three field goal attempts blocked over two weeks.

Cleveland Browns
Blewitt was signed to the Cleveland Browns' practice squad on December 29, 2021. He signed a reserve/futures contract with the Browns on January 11, 2022 and was released on May 2, 2022.

References

External links
 Pittsburgh Panthers bio

1995 births
Living people
American football placekickers
Pittsburgh Panthers football players
Chicago Bears players
Washington Football Team players
Cleveland Browns players